Alfredo Marini (born December 12, 1915) was an Italian professional football player.

He played for 2 seasons (3 games) in the Serie A for A.S. Roma.

His older brother also played football professionally, to distinguish them, Alfredo was referred to as Marini II.

1915 births
Year of death missing
Italian footballers
Serie A players
A.S. Roma players
Rimini F.C. 1912 players
Association football midfielders